Joakim Persson (born 3 April 2002) is a Swedish footballer who plays as a forward for Brage on loan from IK Sirius.

Career statistics

Club

Notes

References

2002 births
Living people
Swedish footballers
Association football forwards
IK Sirius Fotboll players
IFK Luleå players
IK Brage players
Allsvenskan players
Superettan players
Ettan Fotboll players